Lee at the Alamo is an alternate history short story by Harry Turtledove. It was published online at tor.com on September 7, 2011.

Plot summary
The story begins with the point of divergence in December 1860 by General David E. Twiggs bring unable to take command of the Department of Texas, which leaves Lieutenant-Colonel Robert E. Lee as the commander. The story itself is set in February 1861, shortly after the state of Texas voted to secede from the United States to join the Confederacy, to March 1861. Lee concludes that it is his duty to defend U.S. Army munitions and property in San Antonio, Texas, including the fabled Alamo, rather than to allow their surrender to the seceding Texas government, as Twiggs did in real life. That leads to a Second Battle of the Alamo.

Lee is forced to surrender to Benjamin McCulloch after several weeks of siege but becomes a national hero. After Virginia eventually secedes, US President Abraham Lincoln is able to convince Lee to stay in the Union's service by agreeing to send him west, where he will not be fighting against his fellow Virginians.

Award nomination
"Lee at the Alamo" was nominated for a Sidewise Award for Alternate History in 2012.

References

External links
 "Lee at the Alamo" on Tor.com

Short stories by Harry Turtledove
2011 short stories
Cultural depictions of Robert E. Lee
Cultural depictions of Abraham Lincoln
American Civil War alternate histories
Fiction set in 1860
Fiction set in 1861